Second Maeen cabinet is the current cabinet of Yemen led by Maeen Abdulmalek since 18 December 2020. The new government has been made up of 24 ministers and sworn in before President Abdurabbu Mansour Hadi in Riyadh on 26 December 2020.

List of ministers 
(18 December 2020 – present)

See also 

 Politics of Yemen

References 

Cabinets of Yemen
Second Maeen Cabinet